Krzysztof Kamiński (born 26 November 1990) is a Polish professional footballer who plays as a goalkeeper for Wisła Płock.

Career statistics

References

External links

Profile at Júbilo Iwata

Living people
1990 births
Polish footballers
Polish expatriate footballers
Poland under-21 international footballers
Association football goalkeepers
Sportspeople from Masovian Voivodeship
People from Nowy Dwór Mazowiecki
MKP Pogoń Siedlce players
Wisła Płock players
Ruch Chorzów players
Ekstraklasa players
I liga players
II liga players
III liga players
J1 League players
J2 League players
Júbilo Iwata players
Polish expatriate sportspeople in Japan
Expatriate footballers in Japan